Tu'i Malila (1777 – 16 May 1966) was a tortoise that Captain James Cook was traditionally said to have given to the royal family of Tonga. She was a female radiated tortoise (Astrochelys radiata) from Madagascar. Although believed to have been a male during its life, examination after the tortoise's death suggested it was female.

The name means King Malila in the Tongan language.

Life
According to one story, Tu'i Malila was one of a pair of tortoises given by Captain Cook to the Tongan royal family upon his visit to Tonga in July 1777. The other tortoise reportedly died shortly after Cook's visit. This story has been discounted on the basis that Cook made no mention of the event in his journal, although it has been suggested that the tortoise may have been the gift of a member of Cook's crew instead.

According to other sources, George Tupou I obtained her from a vessel which called in Haʻapai in the first half of the 19th century.

The tortoise was taken to Muʻa, where it was kept in a compound named Malila, from which it took its name. Around 1921, Sālote Tupou III moved the tortoise to the Royal Palace. Despite being kicked by a horse and run over several times, the tortoise continued its life, although it was left blind and with a badly wounded right-hand side.

During Queen Elizabeth II's Royal Tour of Tonga in 1953, Tu'i Malila was one of the first animals shown to the monarch on her official visit to the island nation.

The tortoise died on 16 May 1966.

A Reuters dispatch of the tortoise makes an appearance as an epigraph in Philip K. Dick's Do Androids Dream of Electric Sheep?

See also 
Adwaita
Harriet
Jonathan (tortoise)
List of long-living organisms

References 

1777 animal births
1966 animal deaths
Individual tortoises